Nooroo is a locality in northern New South Wales, Australia, northwest of the town of  Stroud. A railway station on the North Coast railway line served the locality between 1913 and 1975.

References

Disused regional railway stations in New South Wales
Suburbs of Mid-Coast Council
Railway stations in the Hunter Region
Railway stations in Australia opened in 1913
Railway stations closed in 1975